("For the wedding ceremony"), WAB 54, is a wedding song composed by Anton Bruckner on 27 November 1878.

History 
Bruckner composed the setting for the wedding ceremony of his landlord Anton Ölzelt Ritter von Newin with Amalie Edler von Wieser. The piece was intended to be performed during the ceremony in the church of the Klosterneuburg Abbey. However, the ceremony did not occur, because the groom was a Protestant.

It was first published in the yearbook of the Klosterneuburg Abbey (Vienna & Leipzig) in 1910. It has been re-edited by Wöss in 1921 together with the Ave Regina caelorum, WAB 8.

It is not known when the piece was performed first. A performance by the Hilliard Ensemble occurred on 15 September 1993 during the 20th Brucknerfest.

Text 
The work sets a text by Heinrich von der Mattig.

Music 
The 64-bar long work in D major is scored for a men's choir  a cappella.

Discography 

There is a single recording of :
 Thomas Kerbl, Chorvereinigung Bruckner 12, Weltliche Männerchöre – CD: LIVA 054, 2012 (sung by a men's vocal quartet)

References

Sources 
 Anton Bruckner – Sämtliche Werke, Band XXIII/2:  Weltliche Chorwerke (1843–1893), Musikwissenschaftlicher Verlag der Internationalen Bruckner-Gesellschaft, Angela Pachovsky and Anton Reinthaler (Editor), Vienna, 1989
 Uwe Harten, Anton Bruckner. Ein Handbuch. , Salzburg, 1996. .
 Cornelis van Zwol, Anton Bruckner 1824–1896 – Leven en werken, uitg. Thoth, Bussum, Netherlands, 2012.

External links 
 
  
 Zur Vermählungsfeier D-Dur, WAB 54 Critical discography by Hans Roelofs 
 The performance of Zur Vermählungsfeier, WAB 54, by the Männerchorvereinigung Bruckner 12 can be heard on YouTube: Zur Vermählungsfeier

Weltliche Chorwerke by Anton Bruckner
1878 compositions
Compositions in D major